Yongmun Station is a station on the Gyeongui-Jungang Line in Gyeonggi-do, South Korea. It was the eastern terminus of the commuter railway, running from Seoul to Yangpyeong County until 2017. Mugunghwa trains also stop at this station.

Nearby attractions include Mt. Yongmun (1,157 m), a popular place for mountain hikers, and Yongmunsa, a Buddhist temple.

References

External links
 Station information from Korail

Railway stations in Gyeonggi Province
Metro stations in Yangpyeong County
Seoul Metropolitan Subway stations
Railway stations opened in 1939